Malick Evouna (born 28 November 1992) is a Gabonese professional footballer who plays as a striker for Egyptian club Aswan SC

Career 
After scoring twelve goals in 17 matches in 2012–13 season for CF Mounana, Evouna joined Moroccan side Wydad Casablanca scoring eight goals in his debut season.

On July 11, 2015 it was announced that Evouna joined Al Ahly of Egypt.

On July 11, 2016 Evouna was transferred to Tianjin Teda F.C. of China.

On November 26, 2020 Evouna was transferred to CS Sfaxien of Tunisia.

On July 4, 2022 Evouna returned to Egypt by signing for Aswan SC

International career
On 9 November 2012, Evouna made his debut for the Gabon national football team against Saudi Arabia. He was included in Gabon's squad for 2015 Africa Cup of Nations and scored in their opening match against Burkina Faso.

As of June 2016, Evouna has scored 12 goals for Gabon national football team.

International goals
Scores and results list Gabon's goal tally first.

References

External links 
 
 

1992 births
Living people
Association football forwards
Gabonese footballers
Gabonese expatriate footballers
Egyptian Premier League players
Botola players
Chinese Super League players
Süper Lig players
Primeira Liga players
Liga Portugal 2 players
Tunisian Ligue Professionnelle 1 players
Al Ahly SC players
Wydad AC players
Tianjin Jinmen Tiger F.C. players
Konyaspor footballers
C.D. Santa Clara players
C.D. Nacional players
CS Sfaxien players
Gabon international footballers
2015 Africa Cup of Nations players
2017 Africa Cup of Nations players
Sportspeople from Libreville
Gabonese expatriate sportspeople in Morocco
Gabonese expatriate sportspeople in China
Gabonese expatriate sportspeople in Egypt
Gabonese expatriate sportspeople in Turkey
Gabonese expatriate sportspeople in Portugal
Gabonese expatriate sportspeople in Tunisia
Expatriate footballers in Morocco
Expatriate footballers in China
Expatriate footballers in Egypt
Expatriate footballers in Turkey
Expatriate footballers in Portugal
Expatriate footballers in Tunisia
21st-century Gabonese people
Gabon A' international footballers
2011 African Nations Championship players